Tingle may refer to:

People
Henry Tingle Wilde (1872–1912), chief officer on the Titanic

Surname
Aubrey Tingle, Canadian pediatrician
Chuck Tingle, pseudonymous author of gay niche erotica
Jack Tingle (1924–1958), American basketball player
Jimmy Tingle (born 1955), American comedian
John Tingle (1931–2022), Australian journalist and politician, father of Laura
Laura Tingle (born 1961), Australian journalist
Sam Tingle (1921–2008), Rhodesian racing driver
Scott D. Tingle (born 1965), American NASA astronaut
Tim Tingle, native American storyteller

Fictional characters
Eve Tingle, the titular character from the black comedy film Teaching Mrs. Tingle
Tingle (character), character in a series of Nintendo video games

Music
"Tingle" (song), 1991 single by That Petrol Emotion from their album Chemicrazy
Tingles (album), a 1990 album by Ratcat

Other uses
Red tingle, popular name for Eucalyptus jacksonii in Western Australia
Rate's tingle, popular name for Eucalyptus brevistylis
Yellow tingle, common name for Eucalyptus guilfoylei

See also

Tingle Creek Chase, a horserace
Tingling sensation associated with paresthesia
Tingly

Tingler (disambiguation)